Empty Hands is a 1924 American silent romantic drama film directed by Victor Fleming, and starring Jack Holt and Norma Shearer. The film was produced by the Famous Players-Lasky and distributed by Paramount Pictures.

Cast

Preservation
With no prints of Empty Hands located in any film archives, it is a lost film.

References

External links

Still at silentfilmstillarchive.com
Stills at normashearer.com

1924 films
1924 romantic drama films
American romantic drama films
American silent feature films
American black-and-white films
Films directed by Victor Fleming
Paramount Pictures films
Lost American films
1924 lost films
Lost romantic drama films
1920s American films
Silent romantic drama films
Silent American drama films